The Harold Pender Award, initiated in 1972 and named after founding Dean Harold Pender, is given by the Faculty of the School of Engineering and Applied Science of the University of Pennsylvania to an outstanding member of the engineering profession who has achieved distinction by significant contributions to society. The Pender Award is the School of Engineering's highest honor.

Past recipients
 2018: Yann LeCun, for his work in convolutional neural networks.
 2013: Barbara Liskov, for her work in programming languages, programming methodology and distributed systems.
 2010: Robert E. Kahn and Vinton G. Cerf, for their pioneering and seminal contributions to network-based information technology, and especially for the design and implementation of the TCP/IP protocol suite, which continues to provide the foundation for the growing Internet
 2006: Mildred Dresselhaus, for pioneering contributions and leadership in the field of carbon-based nanostructures and nanotechnology, and for promoting opportunities for women in science and engineering
 2003: Dennis Ritchie and Ken Thompson, for development of the UNIX operating system and C programming language
 2002: John J. Hopfield, for his pioneering accomplishments in the field of computational neuroscience and neuroengineering
 2000: Jack St. Clair Kilby, for his contribution to the invention of the integrated circuit, or microchip
 1999: John H. Holland, founder of genetic algorithms and innovative research in the science of complexity and adaptation
 1995: George Dantzig, developer of the simplex algorithm spawning the field of linear programming
 1993: Hiroshi Inose, leader in advances in digital communication and in increasing our understanding of the effects of information flow on society
 1991: Arno Penzias, discoverer of the background microwave blackbody radiation of the universe
 1990: Dana S. Scott, pioneer in application of concepts from logic and algebra to the development of mathematical semantics of programming languages
 1989: Leo Esaki, pioneer in tunneling phenomena in semiconductors and development of quantum well structures
 1988: John Bardeen, co-inventor of the transistor and contributor to the theory of superconductivity
 1987: Herbert A. Simon, contributor to cross-disciplinary work between computer science, psychology, economics, and management, including the development of artificial intelligence and cognitive science
 1986: Ronold W. P. King, leader in the development of electromagnetic antenna theory
 1985: Amnon Yariv, innovator in quantum electronics and integrated optics
 1984: Carver Mead and Lynn Conway, developers of CAD techniques for VLSI technology and authors of first VLSI textbook
 1983: John Backus, developer of speed-coding and FORTRAN
 1982: Maurice V. Wilkes, developer of world's second large-scale general-purpose electronic digital computer and author of first digital computer programmers textbook
 1981: Richard W. Hamming, father of algebraic coding theory
 1980: Robert N. Noyce, developer of the integrated circuit
 1979: Edwin H. Land, Inventor of instant photography
 1978: Claude E. Shannon, creator of quantitative Information theory
 1977: Jan A. Rajchman, electronic and computer research
 1976: Hyman G. Rickover, USN, father of the nuclear navy
 1975: Chauncey Starr, founder of the Electric Power Research Institute (EPRI)
 1974: Peter C. Goldmark, inventor of the 33-1/3 rpm long-playing record (among other things)
 1973: John Mauchly and J. Presper Eckert, inventors of ENIAC
 1972: Edward E. David Jr., science advisor to the President of the United States

See also

 List of engineering awards

References

Awards established in 1972
American awards
Engineering awards